James Dickey (March 22, 1934 – February 17, 2018) was an American college football player and coach. He served as the head football coach at Kansas State University from 1978 to 1985, compiling record of 24–54–2. In 1981, he redshirted 18 players, including eight seniors and almost all of his best players. With all of those players returning the following season in 1982, Dickey led Kansas State to their first bowl game appearance in school history, the Independence Bowl, where they lost to the Wisconsin Badgers. 1982 was also the first winning season for the program since 1970 under head coach Vince Gibson.

After opening the 1985 season with two consecutive losses to I-AA teams, Dickey was forced to resign on September 15. Assistant athletic director Lee Moon coached the team for the remainder of the season posting a 1–8 record.

Dickey was the father of the former Kansas State quarterback and former head football coach at the University of North Texas, Darrell Dickey. He died on February 17, 2018, at the age of 83.

Head coaching record

References

1934 births
2018 deaths
American football quarterbacks
Florida Gators football coaches
Houston Cougars football coaches
Houston Cougars football players
Kansas Jayhawks football coaches
Kansas State Wildcats football coaches
North Carolina Tar Heels football coaches
Oklahoma Sooners football coaches
Oklahoma State Cowboys football coaches